The 1970 Jordanian  League (known as The Jordanian  League, was the 20th season of Jordan  League since its inception in 1944. Al-Faisaly won its 11th title. When the West Bank, fell during the 1967 Six-Day War, West Bank teams no longer participated in the Jordanian league, the Football Association established a classification league in 1969, qualifying from this league 6 teams to form the 1970 First Division (currently Jordanian Pro League).

Teams

Map

League table 

The league was played in one round.

Overview
Al-Faysali won the championship.

References
RSSSF

External links
 Jordan Football Association website

Jordanian Pro League seasons
Jordan
Jordan
football